The Joker is a fictional character in the DC Extended Universe (DCEU) multimedia franchise, primarily portrayed by Jared Leto. Based on the DC Comics supervillain of the same name, he was first adapted by writer-director David Ayer and executive producer Zack Snyder for Suicide Squad (2016), and returning with a drastic redesign in Zack Snyder's Justice League (2021). As in the comics, the Joker is depicted as a psychopathic master criminal in Gotham City, the archenemy of the superhero Batman, and the on-again off-again lover of Harley Quinn.

The DCEU marks the fourth time the Joker has been cinematically adapted for live-action, while Leto is the first actor to portray the character in more than one film.

Development and portrayal

Behind the scenes

Zack Snyder revealed that the Joker was initially planned to make his DCEU debut in Batman v Superman: Dawn of Justice (2016) alongside the Riddler but both characters were ultimately cut from the film.

Academy Award-winning actor Jared Leto was cast to portray the Joker in the 2016 film Suicide Squad, directed by David Ayer. Leto described his role as "nearly Shakespearean" and a "beautiful disaster of a character;" about portraying the villain, he stated, "I took a pretty deep dive. But this was a unique opportunity and I couldn't imagine doing it another way. It was fun, playing these psychological games. But at the same time it was very painful." In preparation for the role, Leto utilized method acting similar to Ledger's preparation for his own performance; he spent his time alone, listened to gospel music from the 1920s—commenting he senses "Joker may be much older than people think"—and read literature on shamanism. Influences for the character's appearance include the work of Alejandro Jodorowsky. The Joker's tattoos were added by Ayer, who believed it gave the character a modernized gangster look. Leto had also shaven his eyebrows for the role.

Leto never broke character throughout filming, with Will Smith, who portrayed Deadshot, going as far as stating he never met him. In addition, Viola Davis, who portrayed Amanda Waller, later stated in an interview that during the early stages of filming, Leto had a "henchman" leave a dead pig on a table in the rehearsal room, unsettling Davis until she "snapped out of it" and used the incident to motivate her own performance, and that Leto had also given Margot Robbie, who portrayed Harley Quinn, a live black rat in a box. Davis commented that Robbie "screamed, and then she kept it." Other "Joker-esque gifts" to the cast members included ammunition given to Smith, used condoms, anal beads, and a video of Leto in-character shown to everyone, which "blew their minds", according to Slipknot actor Adam Beach. Leto later commented on his antics, saying that despite "freaking everybody out", the point was to "inspire some chaos and insanity on this set."

Due to the film's difficult production, similar to that of Justice League, many of Leto's scenes were ultimately left out of the film's final cut, though he appears extensively in additional footage added in the film's extended cut. An interview with Leto revealed that he was upset over the removal of his work, which he called "enough material for a whole movie".

In Birds of Prey, an uncredited body double portrays the Joker, providing a back-shot of the character as he is seen tattooing another man's face with Harley Quinn. Leto did not appear in the film purportedly due to his role in the Sony Pictures Universe of Marvel Characters film Morbius and the release of Todd Phillips' film about the Joker starring Joaquin Phoenix.

Upon Zack Snyder's Justice League being greenlit, Leto's Joker was added to the story despite not being planned to appear in the original theatrical cut, and was redesigned for the "Snyder Cut". This makes Leto the first actor to portray the Joker in two live-action films. He joined the film for additional shoots in October 2020.

Fictional character biography

Against Batman and Rescuing Quinn 

Joker manipulates psychiatrist Harleen Quinzel (Margot Robbie) into falling in love with him during his time as a patient in Arkham Asylum, eventually managing to convince her to free him, and electrocutes her before taking her to Ace Chemicals. Quinzel voluntarily falls into the solution that created Joker, bleaching her skin and completing her transformation into Harley Quinn. 

Sometime later, the Joker kills Batman's (Ben Affleck) partner, Robin, with Quinn's help. She is ultimately apprehended and forced into joining Amanda Waller's (Viola Davis) government task force.

In 2016, Joker tortures one of Waller's security officers for the location of the facility where the nano explosives used as leverage over the criminals are manufactured and threatens an A.R.G.U.S. scientist there to disable the bomb implanted in Quinn's neck. After commanding a military helicopter, Joker and his men rescue Harley during the task force's mission in Midway City. The helicopter is shot down, and Quinn falls out, prompting her to rejoin the task force. Sometime later, Joker breaks into Belle Reve Prison with his gang and frees Quinn from her cell.

Later life 

By 2020, Joker and Quinn have broken up, dumping her in the streets of Gotham City. Joker's absence from Quinn's life forces her to adapt and survive without his presence and protection.

Knightmare reality 

In a post-apocalyptic reality, Joker is a member of an insurgency led by Batman. As the insurgency make their way to a ruined city, Batman and Joker get into an argument, with Joker taunting Batman about the deaths of his parents and Robin, while Batman reveals that Quinn is dead and that he had promised her on her deathbed to "slowly kill" Joker. The Insurgency is confronted by Superman (Henry Cavill), causing Joker to break out into maniacal laughter.

Other appearances 
Leto appears in-character as the Joker alongside Skrillex and Rick Ross in the music video for the latter two artists' single "Purple Lamborghini", which was released on the official soundtrack album for Suicide Squad. The song is purportedly written from Joker's point of view.

Reception 
Jared Leto's interpretation of the Joker as seen in Suicide Squad polarized critics and fans. His performance was described as "scene-stealing", yet "wasted" due to his limited screen time. Adding to this was that while Leto's iteration of the character was considered intriguing, the film seemingly omitted significant footage that would have fleshed out his character. Christopher Orr of The Atlantic described Leto's performance as "Ledger-Lite" and a "super-cameo", unfavorably comparing this iteration to Jack Nicholson and Heath Ledger's previous portrayals. According to Billy Givens of We Got This Covered, some fans disliked the character's re-imagining as a "psychotic romantic more concerned with being cool than with sowing his usual chaos" who had ditched the "flamboyant clothing that's become synonymous with the villain for a noir-style gangster aesthetic full of hokey face tattoos and a grill." However, Mark Hamill, who voiced the Joker in various DC projects, said that he "loved" Leto's take on the character, commenting that each interpretation of the Joker should be different depending on the tale being told. 

For his role as the Joker, Leto received a Golden Raspberry Award nomination for his performance. In contrast, he was also nominated for the Jupiter Awards for Best International Actor and the MTV Movie Award for Best Villain.

The Joker's inclusion in the trailer for Zack Snyder's Justice League, in addition to leaked footage of his redesigned appearance, received a warmer reception than his appearance in Suicide Squad. It also generated considerable commentary for his "we live in a society" line (which was omitted from the release), due to the line's status as an internet meme commonly associated with the Joker.

See also 
Joker in other media
Joker (Jack Napier)
Joker (The Dark Knight)
Characters of the DC Extended Universe

References

 The plot description was adapted from Joker at the DC Extended Universe Wiki, which is available under a Creative Commons Attribution-Share Alike 3.0 license.

External links

Action film villains
Batman characters
Batman live-action film characters
DC Comics male supervillains
DC Extended Universe characters
Fictional characters with disfigurements
Fictional clowns
Fictional characters from New Jersey
Fictional characters without a name
Fictional crime bosses
Fictional domestic abusers
Fictional gangsters
Fictional mass murderers
Fictional rampage and spree killers
Fictional serial killers
Fictional murderers of children
Fictional torturers
Film characters introduced in 2016
Film supervillains
Joker (character)
Joker (character) in other media
Male film villains